The Yamaha PW50 is a commercially available two-stroke  mini dirt bike, designed, developed and produced by Japanese manufacturer Yamaha since 1980.

References 

PW50